The 1994–95 FIS Ski Jumping World Cup was the 16th World Cup season in ski jumping and the 5th official World Cup season in ski flying. It began in Planica, Slovenia on 10 December 1994 and finished in Oberstdorf, Germany on 25 February 1995. The individual World Cup was won by Andreas Goldberger and Nations Cup by Finland.

Lower competitive circuits this season included the Grand Prix and Continental Cup.

Map of world cup hosts 
All 15 locations which have been hosting world cup events for men this season. Events in Predazzo and Courchevel canceled. Oberstdorf hosted ski flying event and four hills tournament.

 Four Hills Tournament

Calendar

Men

Men's team

Standings

Overall

Ski Flying

Nations Cup

Four Hills Tournament

References 

World cup
World cup
FIS Ski Jumping World Cup

sl:Svetovni pokal v smučarskih skokih 1994